The Bramble is a cocktail created by Dick Bradsell in 1980s London, England. Best described as a spring cocktail, the Bramble brings together dry gin, lemon juice, sugar syrup, crème de mûre, and crushed ice. Bradsell also suggests finishing off the cocktail with some fresh red fruits (such as blackberries, cranberries) and a slice of lemon.

If crème de mûre is unavailable, many bartenders will substitute creme de cassis for it.

History
The Bramble was created in London, in 1984, by Dick Bradsell. At the time, Bradsell worked at a bar in Soho called Fred's Club, and he wanted to create a British cocktail. Memories of going blackberrying in his childhood on the Isle of Wight provided the inspiration for the Bramble.

The name of the drink comes from the fact that blackberry bushes are called brambles.

See also
 List of cocktails

References

External links
 
 
 

Cocktails with gin
Cocktails with liqueur